Fiction Plane is an English rock band consisting of lead vocalist and bass player Joe Sumner, guitarist Seton Daunt, and drummer Pete Wilhoit.

History 
When Sumner was a teenager in England, he was inspired to write songs after he heard Nirvana's album Nevermind. Sumner, having grown up around the music industry with his father Gordon “Sting” Sumner, already knew how to play guitar and drums, so he started a band with Dan Brown, a friend from school who played bass. Fiction Plane began to form in 1999 when they were joined by guitarist Seton Daunt.

At a live performance a few years later, they attracted the attention of David Kahne, a producer who escorted them into a studio to record their debut album, Everything Will Never Be OK. Lacking a full-time drummer, they invited Abe Laboriel Jr., a session musician who had played with them before. After the album was released, they hired Pete Wilhoit, a drummer from Bloomington, Indiana, and Fiction Plane was launched.

The band contributed the song "If Only" to the film Holes.  The song's lyrics are mostly based on a recurring poem from the film and its source novel.  The film's soundtrack album was released in April 2003, only a month after the release of Everything Will Never Be OK.

Following their debut, the band released Bitter Forces and Lame Race Horses (2005), Left Side of the Brain (2007),  Paradiso (2009), Sparks (2010), and Mondo Lumina (2015).

Fiction Plane's popularity increased in 2007 when they were the opening act for The Police's reunion tour  - Joe Sumner is the son of Police lead singer Sting.

Discography

Studio albums

Extended plays

Live albums

Band members

Current
 Joe Sumner – lead vocals, bass (1999–present)
 Seton Daunt – guitar (1999–present)
 Pete Wilhoit – drums (1999–present)

Former
 Dan Brown – bass, keyboards, backing vocals (1999–2006)

References

British musical trios
English rock music groups
Musical groups established in 1999
1999 establishments in England
MCA Records artists
Roadrunner Records artists
Bieler Bros. Records artists
English alternative rock groups
English indie rock groups